Surfing competitions at the 2023 Pan American Games are scheduled to be held between October 24th and 30th, 2023 at Punta de Lobos beach in the Pichilemu commune of Chile.

8 medal events are scheduled to be contested (four per each gender). A total of 88 surfers will qualify to compete at the games.

The event will be used as a qualifier for the  2024 Summer Olympics in Paris, France.

Qualification

A total of 88 surfers will qualify across various qualification tournaments. The host nation Chile, will be automatically be allocated ten quota spots across the eight events. In the shortboard category, a country can enter two athletes, with a maximum one in all other categories. A country can enter a maximum ten surfers (five per gender). An athlete can only qualify one quota for their country.

Participating nations
A total of 9 countries qualified athletes so far.

Medal summary

Men's events

Women's events

See also
Surfing at the 2024 Summer Olympics

References

Events at the 2023 Pan American Games
Pan American Games
2023
Surfing in Chile